This is a list of notable women writers who were born in Bangladesh or whose writings are closely associated with that country.

A
Shaheen Akhtar (born 1962), novelist, short story writer, editor
Monica Ali (born 1967), Bangladeshi-British novelist, essayist
Tahmima Anam (born 1975), novelist, short story writer, essayist
Iffat Ara (born 1939), novelist, short story writer, essayist, magazine editor, educator, women's rights activist
Husne Ara Shahed (1939–2022), novelist, non-fiction writer, educator
Shamim Azad (born 1952), Bangladeshi-British poet, short story writer, novelist, children's writer

B
Purabi Basu (born 1949), 21st-century short story writer, women's rights activist

H
Anwara Syed Haq (born 1940), novelist, short story writer, children's writer, essayist
Dilara Hashem (1935–2022), novelist
Roquia Sakhawat Hussain (1880–1932), essayist, short story writer, novelist, poet, feminist, author of Sultana's Dream
Selina Hossain (born 1947), acclaimed novelist

I
Nilima Ibrahim (1921–2002), non-fiction writer, novelist, playwright, short story writer, translator, educator
Jahanara Imam (1929–1994), non-fiction writer, diarist, political activist

J
Nasreen Jahan (born 1966), novelist, editor
 Adiba Jaigirdar, Bangladeshi-Irish writer

K
Naila Kabeer (born 1950), social economist, non-fiction writer
Siddika Kabir (1931–2012), cookbook writer, television host
Sufia Kamal (1911–1999), poet, feminist
Rabina Khan (born 1972), Bangladeshi-British novelist, playwright, film producer, politician
Razia Khan (1936–2011), novelist
Rabeya Khatun (1935–2021), novelist

M
Mokbula Manzoor (1938–2020), novelist
Shahnaz Munni (born 1969), poet, short story writer, journalist, television news editor

N
Taslima Nasrin (born 1962), columnist, novelist, autobiographer

R
Rizia Rahman (1939–2019), novelist
Kamini Roy (1864–1933), Bengali feminist, poet, essayist, children's writer in British India

See also
List of women writers

References

-
Bangladeshi women writers, List of
Writers
Writers, women